Bria is an ancient city in Phrygia, Asia Minor. Bria was located in the late Roman province of Phrygia Pacatiana Prima, south of Acmonia. It was probably within the conventus iuridicus of Apamea.

Bria is the Thraco-Phrygian word for 'town', and appears in other placenames, such as Mesembria and Selymbria.

Bria issued coins under the Severan dynasty.

Ecclesiastical history 
The see of Bria was a suffragan of Laodicea in Phrygia (Laodicea on the Lycus). Its only historically documented bishop was Macedonius, who participated in the council of Constantinople of 536. It is not documented in Notitiae episcoporum which started in the 7th century nor in Lequien's Oriens Christianus.

In 1933, the diocese became the Latin titular bishopric of Bria.

References

Sources 
 GCatholic - data for all sections
 Sylvain Destephen, Prosopographie chrétienne du Bas-Empire 3. Prosopographie du diocèse d'Asie (325-641), Paris 2008

Catholic titular sees in Asia
Lost ancient cities and towns
Populated places in Phrygia
Former populated places in Turkey
Roman towns and cities in Turkey
Populated places of the Byzantine Empire